Alan Marshall , (2 May 1902 – 21 January 1984) was an Australian writer, story teller, humanist and social documenter.

He received the Australian Literature Society Short Story Award three times, the first in 1933.  His best known book, I Can Jump Puddles (1955) is the first of a three-part autobiography. The other two volumes are This is the Grass (1962) and In Mine Own Heart (1963).

Life and work
Marshall was born in Noorat, Victoria. At six years old he contracted polio, which left him with a physical disability that grew worse as he grew older. From an early age, he resolved to be a writer, and in I Can Jump Puddles he demonstrated an almost total recall of his childhood in Noorat. The characters and places of his book are thinly disguised from real life: Mount Turalla is Mount Noorat, Lake Turalla is Lake Keilambete, the Curruthers are the Blacks, Mrs. Conlon is Mary Conlon of Dixie, Terang, and his best friend, Joe from the books, is Leo Carmody.
Australian poet and contemporary, Hal Porter wrote in 1965 that Marshall was:
... the warmest and most centralized human being ... To walk with ease and nonchalance the straight, straight line between appearing tragic and appearing willfully brave is a feat so complex I should not like to have to rake in the dark for the super-bravery to accomplish it.During the early 1930s Marshall worked as an accountant at the Trueform Boot and Shoe Company, Clifton Hill and later wrote about life in the factory in his novel How beautiful are Thy Feet, 1949.
Marshall wrote numerous short stories, mainly set in the bush. He also wrote newspaper columns and magazine articles. He traveled widely in Australia and overseas. He also collected and published Indigenous Australian stories and legends.

His literary friends and associates included John Morrison and Clem Christesen.

He married Olive Dulcie Dixon in May 1941 and they had 2 daughters, Katherine and Jennifer. The couple divorced in 1957. For many years he lived in Sandringham

Marshall died on 21 January 1984 in a nursing home in Brighton East Victoria where he had been a resident for the last two years. His remains are interred at Nillumbik Cemetery, Diamond Creek, Victoria.

Television series

In 1981 the Australian Broadcasting Corporation produced a nine-part mini-series of Marshall's autobiographical stories. The actor, Adam Garnett, won the 1982 Logie Awards for Best Performance by a Juvenile, for his role as Alan Marshall in the series.

Recognition

In 1979 Alan Marshall unveiled a plaque on a monument to himself at his birthplace in Noorat.

Marshall was made a Member of the Order of Australia in the 1981 Australia Day Honours.

In 1985 the Shire of Eltham, where Marshall had lived for many years, established the annual Alan Marshall Short Story Competition for emergent writers.
In 1937, he completed his first novel, How Beautiful Are Thy Feet, which remained unpublished until 1949.

There is a bronze bust of him and a plaque in the Sandringham Library, Melbourne.

Sculptor Marcus Skipper created a realistic statue of Marshall cast in bronze which is located in the front of Eltham Library, a branch of Yarra Plenty Regional Library. It has been classified as significant by the National Trust.

Alan Marshall Reserve, Eltham is located on the corner of Main Road and Leane Drive, and has been there since at least 2007.

Bibliography

Autobiography

 I Can Jump Puddles. Melbourne: F. W. Cheshire, 1955.
 This is the Grass. Melbourne: F. W. Cheshire, 1962. .
 In Mine Own Heart. Melbourne: F. W. Cheshire, 1963.

Collections
 The Complete Stories of Alan Marshall, with illustrations by Noel Counihan. Melbourne: Thomas Nelson 
 Aboriginal Myths, with Sreten Bozic. Melbourne: Gold Star Publications, 1972. 
 Pull Down The Blind, with illustrations by Noel Counihan. Melbourne: F. W. Cheshire & London: Wadley & Ginn, 1949

Non-fiction
 These are My People. Melbourne: F.W. Cheshire, 1944
 Ourselves Writ Strange. Melbourne: F. W. Cheshire, 1948, later reprinted as These Were My Tribesmen
Pioneers & Painters: One hundred years of Eltham and its Shire, Thomas Nelson, 1971

Fiction
 How Beautiful Are Thy Feet. Melbourne: Chesterhill Press, 1949. 
 Fight for Life North Melbourne: Cassell Australia, [1972]

Children's Fiction
 Whispering in the Wind. Thomas Nelson (Australia) Ltd, 1969.

Notes

References

Miller, E. Morris & Frederick T. Macartney (1956) Australian Literature, Sydney, Angus & Robertson, pp. 324–5.
Morrison, John (1987), The Happy Warrior, Melbourne, Pascoe Publishing,

External links

 Alan Marshall at AustLit.edu.au
 
 John McLaren, "Marshall, Alan (1902-1984)", Australian Dictionary of Biography, accessed 17 October 2018.

1902 births
1984 deaths
Australian memoirists
Australian male short story writers
People with polio
20th-century Australian historians
20th-century Australian short story writers
20th-century Australian male writers
20th-century memoirists
Writers from Victoria (Australia)